A Faire to Remember is a mix of Renaissance Fair favorites, classic Celtic tunes, as well as some original comedic works from the Bards.

"If I Had a Million Ducats" is a parody of the Barenaked Ladies' hit song "If I Had $1000000".  "Irish Ballad" is a cover of the song by satirist Tom Lehrer.  Also, "Always Look on the Bright Side of Life" is an interpretation of the popular Monty Python song.

Track listing 
Source: Amazon

References

Brobdingnagian Bards albums
2001 albums